Bullard is a surname. Notable people with the surname include:

 Alan Bullard (born 1947), British composer
 Bill Bullard Jr. (1943-2020), American politician
 Charles W. Bullard, 19th-century American criminal
 David Bullard (born 1952), South African writer
 Denys Bullard (1912–1994), British farmer and politician
 Sir Edward Bullard (1907–1980), British geophysicist
 Edward B. Bullard (born 1943), American politician and educator
 Edward P. Bullard Sr. (1841–1906), American founder of the Bullard Machine Tool Company
 Edward P. Bullard Jr. (1872–1953), second president of the Bullard Machine Tool Company
 Eugene Bullard (1895–1961), African-American military pilot
 George Purdy Bullard, Arizona Attorney General 1912–1915
 Sir Giles Bullard (1926–1992), British diplomat
 Henry Adams Bullard (1788–1851), U.S. Congressman from Louisiana, 1831–1834 & 1850–1851
 James B. Bullard, American economist
 Jimmy Bullard (born 1978), English footballer
 Jonathan Bullard (born 1993), American football player
 Sir Julian Bullard (1928–2006), British diplomat
 Larcenia Bullard (1947–2013), American politician
 Laura Curtis Bullard (1831–1912), American writer and women's rights activist
 Louis Bullard (1956–2010), American football player
 Mark W. Bullard (1822–1902), American pioneer
 Martyn Lawrence Bullard (born 1967), English interior designer
 Matt Bullard (born 1967), American basketball player
 Mike Bullard (comedian) (born 1957), Canadian broadcaster
 Mike Bullard (ice hockey) (born 1961), Canadian ice hockey player
 Orson Flagg Bullard (1834-1906), Pennsylvania state representative
 Pat Bullard (born 1959), Canadian television writer and comedian
 Sir Reader Bullard (1885–1976), British diplomat and author
 Robert D. Bullard (born 1946), American sociologist and academic administrator
 Robert Lee Bullard (1861–1947), United States Army general
 Rose Talbot Bullard (1864–1915), American medical doctor and professor
 Samuel A. Bullard (1853–1926), American architect, politician, and university trustee
 Sara Bullard, American writer
 Sarah Bullard (born 1988), American lacrosse player
 Silas Bullard (1841–1922), American politician and jurist
 Thaddeus Bullard (born 1977), American professional wrestler, ring name Titus O'Neil
 William H. G. Bullard (1866–1927), United States Navy admiral
 William Bullard (Dedham) (1594–1686), early resident in Dedham, Massachusetts